Blassie is a surname. Notable people with the surname include:

Freddie Blassie (1918–2003), American professional wrestler and manager
Michael Blassie (1948–1972), officer in the United States Air Force

See also
My Breakfast with Blassie (1983), movie starring Andy Kaufman and professional wrestler "Classy" Freddie Blassie

de:Blassie